Ancestors is an EP by Edith Frost, released in 1997 through Island Records and Trade 2.

Track listing

Personnel 
Edith Frost – vocals, guitar, production
Kramer – bass guitar, synthesizer, production, engineering
Deborah Moore – cover art

References

External links 
 

1997 EPs
Edith Frost albums
Albums produced by Kramer (musician)
Island Records EPs